The Ahmedabad–Viramgam section belongs to Western Railway of Ahmedabad Division.

History
During 19th century Ahmedabad–Viramgam section was owned by BB&CI. During which Ahmedabad–Viramgam section was laid in 1871 by BB&CI. Later BB&CI line was extended to Surendranagar in 1872. After then Broad gauge network to Surendranagar was extended by BB&CI Railway in 1879. Bombay, Baroda and Central India Railway was merged into the Western Railway on 5 November 1951. Later gauge conversion of Ahmedabad–Viramgam section has completed in earlier 1980's.

Freight
Later in October 2011, a goods train with 120 wagons plied on this section.

Speed limits
The Ahmedabad–Viramgam section is classified as a Group D-special class line in which speeds up to 100 km/h is allowed.

References

5 ft 6 in gauge railways in India
Railway lines in Gujarat

Transport in Ahmedabad